Ākenehi Hei (c.1878–28 November 1910), sometimes called Agnes Hei, was a Māori district nurse and midwife in New Zealand. She was the first Māori to become a qualified nurse. Nursing during a typhoid epidemic, she too caught the disease and died, while probably in her early 30s.

She was born in Te Kaha, eastern Bay of Plenty, New Zealand, probably in 1877 or 1878.  She identified with the Te Whakatōhea and Te Whānau-ā-Apanui iwi. She attended Te Kaha Native School, Ōpōtiki convent school, and St Joseph's Māori Girls' College in Napier. She became an assistant nurse and dresser at Napier Hospital in 1901. She trained as a nurse and qualified in June 1908, being appointed a theatre sister at the hospital. Keen to become a district nurse, for which a midwifery qualification was required, she soon left for St Helens Hospital in Christchurch for midwifery training, qualifying in December 1908.

After a short time in private nursing, the Department of Public Health gave her a job providing nursing to Māori during a typhoid epidemic. She worked at various places around the North Island in 1909 and 1910. While based at New Plymouth, she also nursed at villages on the Whanganui River and was able to isolate patients in a makeshift hospital at Jerusalem. She took leave to go to Gisborne to nurse her niece who was seriously ill with typhoid in July 1910. She was soon nursing a number of typhoid patients until she too caught the disease and died in Gisborne Hospital on 28 November 1910.

References

1870s births
1910 deaths
New Zealand nurses
New Zealand midwives
People from Te Kaha
Whakatōhea people
Te Whānau-ā-Apanui people
New Zealand Māori midwives
New Zealand Māori nurses
New Zealand women nurses
Deaths from typhoid fever
Infectious disease deaths in New Zealand